Richard Talbot may refer to:
Richard Talbot, 1st Earl of Tyrconnell (1630–1691), Irish royalist and Jacobite soldier
Richard Talbot (archbishop of Dublin) (c. 1390–1449), leading ecclesiastical and political figures in Ireland
Richard Talbot (bishop of London) (died 1262), Dean of St Paul's, London and bishop-elect of London
Richard Talbot (Irish judge) (c.1520-1577), judge of the Court of Common Pleas
Richard Francis Talbot (1710–1752), Irish-French soldier and diplomat
Richard Talbot (colonist) (1772–1853), Irish-Canadian
Richard Talbot, 2nd Baron Talbot of Malahide (1766–1849), Anglo-Irish politician
Richard Talbot, 2nd Baron Talbot (ca. 1306–1356), English nobleman